Gulab jamun (also spelled gulaab jamun;  or 'Rose berry') is a sweet confectionery or dessert, originating in the Indian subcontinent and a type of mithai popular in India, Pakistan, Nepal, the Maldives (where it is known as gulab ki janu), and Bangladesh, as well as Myanmar. It is also common in nations with substantial populations of people with South Asian heritage, such as Mauritius, Fiji, Gulf states, the Malay Peninsula, Great Britain, South Africa, and the Caribbean countries of Trinidad and Tobago, Guyana, Suriname, and Jamaica.

It is made mainly from milk solids, traditionally from khoya, which is milk reduced to the consistency of a soft dough. Modern recipes call for dried or powdered milk instead of khoya. It is often garnished with dried nuts such as almonds and cashews to enhance flavour.

Preparation 
In the Indian subcontinent, milk and cheese solids are prepared by heating milk over a low flame for a long time until the water content has evaporated and only the milk solids remain. These milk solids, known as khoya, are kneaded into a dough, with a large amount of flour (maida). There are many gulab jamun mixtures on the market, which are blended with water/milk to make the dough. The dough is then shaped into small balls and deep-fried in oil or ghee (clarified butter) at a low temperature of about  until they get their familiar golden brown color. If the balls are cooked quickly, they will be raw on the inside. The fried balls are then soaked in a light sugar syrup flavored with green cardamom and rose water, kewra or saffron.  Hot gulab jamun is often served with vanilla ice-cream or Kulfi.

Origins

Gulab jamun was first prepared in medieval India and was derived from a fritter that Central Asian Turkic invaders brought to India. Another theory claims that it was accidentally prepared by the Mughal emperor Shah Jahan's personal chef.

The word "gulab" is derived from the Persian words gol (flower) and āb (water), referring to the rose water-scented syrup. "Jamun" or "jaman" is the Hindi/Urdu word for Syzygium jambolanum, an Indian fruit with a similar size and shape, commonly known as black plum. Jamun is also defined as a fried delicacy in sugar syrup. The Arab dessert luqmat al-qadi is similar to gulab jamun, although it uses a different batter. According to the culinary historian Michael Krondl, both luqmat al-qadi and gulab jamun may have derived from a Persian dish, with rose water syrup being a common connection between the two.

Consumption customs
Gulab jamun is a dessert often eaten at festivals, birthdays or major celebrations such as marriages, the Muslim celebrations of Eid ul-Fitr and Eid al-Adha, and the Hindu festivals of Diwali (the Indian festival of light) and Ganesh Chaturthi (the coming of Lord Ganesha). There are various types of gulab jamun and every variety has a distinct taste and appearance.

Variants

India

Gulab jamun gets its brownish red colour because of the sugar content in the milk powder (khoya). In other types of gulab jamun, sugar is added in the batter, and after frying, the sugar caramelization gives it its dark, almost black colour, which is then called kala jamun or "black jamun". The sugar syrup may be replaced with (slightly) diluted maple syrup for a gulab jamun.

Homemade gulab jamun is usually made up of khoya, a pinch of all-purpose flour/refined wheat flour/ wheat flour (optional), baking powder and clarified butter (ghee); milk kneaded to form a dough, moulded into balls, deep fried and dropped into simmering sugar syrup.

In Bengali, Gulab Jamun is known as Kalo Jam or Pantua, which is similar to gulab jamun, and could be called a Bengali variant of that dish. Ledikeni, a variation of Pantua, is another variant of gulab jamun. It is said to have been invented by Bhim Chandra Nag on the occasion of a visit by Lady Canning, the wife of Charles Canning, the Governor-General of India during 1856–62.

Katangi, a town near Jabalpur is famous for "Jhurre Ka Rasgulla", which has been made there for the past 100 years. It is several times the size of normal gulab jamuns and is prepared in local desi ghee.

In Rajasthan, instead of soaking gulab jamun balls in sugar syrup, they are cooked in gravy made from spices, nuts and tomato to make popular Gulab Jamun ki Sabzi.

Bangladesh
In Bangladesh, Pantua is available almost everywhere throughout the country, which can be referred to a Bengali variation of Gulab jamun. Also there are two kinds of jamuns that are famous. They are Golap Jam and Kalo Jam.

Nepal 
The sweet is known as Lal Mohan in Nepali language and is available at almost every sweet shop. The sale of the sweet usually increases significantly during festivals such as Tihar, Dashain, etc.

See also

 Rasgulla
 Bamiyeh
 Chè xôi nước
 Leche frita
 Doughnut holes
 List of desserts
 Loukoumades
 Lyangcha
 Tangyuan
 Puff-puff

References

External links

Indian desserts
Uttar Pradeshi cuisine
Bihari cuisine
Sri Lankan cuisine
Pakistani desserts
Nepalese cuisine
Punjabi cuisine
Sindhi cuisine
Pashtun cuisine
Balochi cuisine
Kashmiri cuisine
Mauritian cuisine
Bangladeshi desserts
Bengali desserts
Cheese dishes
Burmese cuisine
Fijian desserts
Burmese desserts and snacks
Deep fried foods
Doughnuts
Indian cuisine
Trinidad and Tobago cuisine